Charles Lemon Bestor (December 21, 1924, New York City – January 16, 2016, Amherst, Massachusetts) was an American composer of contemporary classical music, professor, and administrator.

Early life
Charles Lemon Bestor was born on December 21, 1924 in New York City. He studied with Paul Hindemith at Yale University. He later studied with Vincent Persichetti and Peter Mennin at the Juilliard School, and independently with Vladimir Ussachevsky. He holds degrees from Swarthmore College (Phi Beta Kappa), the University of Illinois at Urbana-Champaign, and the University of Colorado at Boulder.

Career
He taught at the Juilliard School and the University of Colorado at Boulder. He also served as an administrator at Willamette University, the University of Massachusetts Amherst, University of Utah, and University of Alabama. He finally served as a professor at the University of Massachusetts. His notable students include Wallis Bratt, Tony Silva, and Ben Swire.

Bestor's compositions have drawn on 12-tone music and jazz. Recordings of his music have been released on the Capstone, Centaur, New Ariel, Living Artist, MSR Classics, Orion, SCI, and Serenus labels.

The Charles L. Bestor Collection is held by the American Music Research Center at the University of Colorado.

Death
Bestor died in his sleep January 16, 2016 at his home in Amherst, Massachusetts.

References

External links
Charles L. Bestor page
 http://www.legacy.com/obituaries/gazettenet/obituary.aspx?n=Charles-Bestor&pid=177410917

1924 births
2016 deaths
20th-century classical composers
21st-century classical composers
American male classical composers
American classical composers
Juilliard School alumni
Juilliard School faculty
Yale School of Music alumni
Musicians from New York City
Swarthmore College alumni
University of Colorado alumni
University of Massachusetts Amherst faculty
Willamette University people
University of Utah faculty
University of Alabama people
University of Illinois Urbana-Champaign alumni
Pupils of Paul Hindemith
21st-century American composers
20th-century American composers
Classical musicians from New York (state)
20th-century American male musicians
21st-century American male musicians